Stitches in the Flag is the debut album from four-piece Cornish folk punk band Crowns.

The album features a re-recorded version of the title track from their first EP Full Swing.

Track listing

Personnel
Crowns
 Bill Jefferson - vocals/guitar
 Jake Butler - bass/backing vocals
 Jack Speckleton - mandolin/backing vocals
 Nathan Haynes - drums/backing vocals

References

2012 debut albums
Crowns (band) albums